The Buddenbrooks is a 1923 German silent film directed by Gerhard Lamprecht and starring Peter Esser, Mady Christians, and Alfred Abel. It is based on Thomas Mann's 1901 novel The Buddenbrooks.

The film's art direction was by Otto Moldenhauer.

Cast

References

External links

Films based on works by Thomas Mann
Films of the Weimar Republic
Films directed by Gerhard Lamprecht
German silent feature films
UFA GmbH films
Films set in the 1840s
Films set in the 1850s
Films set in the 1860s
Films set in the 1870s
Films about businesspeople
Films about families
1920s historical films
German historical films
German black-and-white films
1920s German films